This article gives an overview about Vietnam Securities Indexes.

History
CBV Index family has been officially renamed as Vietnam Securities Index (VSI) family since September, 2009.

Overview

 Woori CBV Securities Corporation, the world's largest provider of Vietnam's financial market indexes and economic indicators,  is the pioneer to explore and deliver Financial Intelligence of Vietnam.
 Vietnam Securities Indexes (formerly CBV Index), Vietnam's first free float market capitalization weighted indexes, are Vietnam's first equity indexes that compose all stocks listed on the two exchanges in Hanoi and Ho Chi Minh City. Vietnam Securities Index family is the first family of Vietnam finance indexes to be sponsored and introduced  by Bloomberg L.P. to global financial institutions. 
 The index system developed by CBV is the world's largest and most diversified index family for Vietnam financial markets with over 450 kinds of equity indexes, 50 kinds of fixed income indexes, and over 50 other kinds of indexes in other categories. Among them are:	
 Vietnam Bond Index - Composite (formerly CBV Vietnam Bond Composite Index)
 Vietnam OTC Indexes (formerly CBV OTC Index)
 Vietnam Stock/ Bond Composite Index (formerly CBV Vietnam Stock/ Bond Composite Index)
 Vietnam Asset Allocation Performance Indexes
 Vietnam Real Estate Composite Index (formerly CBV Vietnam Real Estate Composite Index)
 Vietnam Investor Confidence Index - the first index of Vietnam Investor Confidence. 
 VND Index, a measure of global strength of Vietnam Dong.
 Vietnam Consumer Confidence Index, a measure of consumer confidence of Vietnam, which is defined as the degree of optimism on their activities of savings and spending.
 Vietnam Monetary Condition Indexes

Vietnam Stock Indices

 VSI Composite: VSI Total, VSI LargeCap, VSI MidCap, VSI SmallCap, VSI 20, VSI 10 (formerly CBV Total, CBV LargeCap, CBV MidCap, CBV SmallCap, CBV 20, CBV 10)
 VSI Industries: VSI Goods, VSI Materials, VSI Oil & Gas, VSI Services, VSI Health Care, VSI Utilities, VSI Financials, VSI Industrials, VSI Technology (formerly CBV Goods, CBV Materials, CBV Oil & Gas, CBV Services, CBV Health Care, CBV Utilities, CBV Financials, CBV Industrials, CBV Technology)
 VSI Value: VSI LargeCap Value, VSI MidCap Value, VSI SmallCap Value (formerly CBV LargeCap Value, CBV MidCap Value, CBV SmallCap Value)
 VSI Growth: VSI LargeCap Growth, VSI MidCap Growth, VSI SmallCap Growth formerly CBV LargeCap Growth, CBV MidCap Growth, CBV SmallCap Growth)

See also
 Woori CBV Securities Corporation
 Vietnam Investor Confidence Index
 VND Index
 Vietnam Consumer Confidence Index
 CBV Index (and CBV Total and CBV-Total-Index)

External links
 Vietnam Securities Index - Total Stock Market on Bloomberg website
 Overview of Woori CBV
 Website of Woori CBV Securities Corporation 
 About Vietnam Securities Index
 Woori CBV Securities Corporation on Wikipedia
 Vietnam Securities Indexes on Website of Vietnam Chamber of Commerce and Industry
 Vietnam Securities Indexes on Website of State Bank of Vietnam
 Vietnam Securities Indexes Article on SBV
 Woori CBV on Vietnamnews
 Woori CBV on Vneconomy 1
 Woori CBV on Saga Finance
 Woori CBV on Website of Businessweek
 Woori CBV on Reuters
 Vietnam Finance Indexes Introduction by Bloomberg in Hong Kong and Singapore

Economy of Hanoi
Vietnamese stock market indices